Select Harvests is Australia's largest almond grower and processor, and is the third largest grower worldwide. It manages almond orchards in Victoria, New South Wales and South Australia, and is also involved in the manufacture of a variety of food snacks and muesli. The company, based in Melbourne, employs around 270 permanently, which peaks up to 500 people seasonally (2015).

The business is divided into two divisions: an almond business which owns and manages orchards, including the harvest and initial processing of the crop, and a food business, which processes and markets a range of nut and fruit based products to retailers, distributors and food manufacturers. These were sold under the Lucky, Sunsol, Nu-Vit, Meriram, Soland, Allinga Farms and Renshaw brands.

In 2021, Select Harvests sold the Lucky and Sunsol brands to Prolife Foods of New Zealand, however, the company has retained the Allinga Farms and Renshaw brands.

History 

Select Harvests was founded in 1978, its listed predecessors have existed since 1983. The company was formerly known as Defender Limited and Defender Australia Limited.

Early Australian almond plantations were first made on the Adelaide Plains in the 19th century. This area was well suited to almond production by virtue of its climate, rainfall, and fertile soils. From here almond plantations spread to southern Adelaide (notably Willunga, South Australia). These areas, however, have been mostly built over following urban expansion.

In the 1960s and 1970s the majority of the industry moved from the Willunga area further east, to along the Murray River with the major growing regions being the Riverland, Sunraysia and Riverina districts. These areas were favourable due to cheaper land, water availability for irrigation, and better suited climate for almond growing. This is where Select Harvests primarily now operates its orchards.

Total Australian almond acreage increased five-fold over the eight years between 1999 and 2007, from approximately 9,000 planted acres in 1999 to 62,000 acres in 2007; of which Select Harvests owns approximately 9,000 acres and leases an additional 4,500 acres.

At the end of 2020, Select Harvests controlled 22,886 acres across the three growing regions, of this, 12,619 acres was owned outright by the company.

Orchards 

The company orchards are based in Robinvale (Northern Victoria), the Riverina, Hillston, and near Griffith in New South Wales, Paringa, South Australia and Loxton, South Australia. In 2014 the company purchased the Amaroo property in Renmark South Australia, which at the time was the largest independent almond orchard in Australia.

In 2008, Select Harvests secured 4,300 acres on the Dandaragan Plateau in Western Australia. In early 2013, Select Harvests decided to exit the Dandaragan Almond project, placing its immature orchards, water rights and associated irrigation infrastructure on market for sale. In December 2015, Select Harvests announced that it would sell its WA orchards and land to an unnamed private Australian business for A$9.5 million after almost A$60 million of write-downs. 

Select Harvests is one of Australia's largest almond exporters and has continued to expand in the fast-growing markets of India and China, as well as established routes to markets in Asia, Europe and the Middle East.

Processing 
Select Harvests has significant almond processing capability which is delivered through its two almonds processing plants, both located in Victoria, Australia.

Thomastown 
The first plant is located in Thomastown, Victoria. Since 2002 it has also been the location of the Select Harvests head office. The site consists of corporate offices, a production facility, laboratory and warehouse; it employs around 54 permanent staff, and 70–140 seasonal production staff. The plant annually produces approximately 13,000 metric tonnes of a range of packaged nuts and associated products.

Carina West 
The second plant is located in vicinity of Carina West, which has a hulling and shelling capacity of 22,000t (6 months) or 10t per hour at peak. The Carina West plant was commissioned in 2008 at a cost of A$40 million, it also has significant storage, sorting, packing, warehousing and fumigation facilities. Select Harvests produces almond products according to Australian Quarantine and Inspection Service, hazard analysis and critical control points, Global Food Safety Initiative (SQF2000), halal and kosher certifications.

In 2015, Select Harvests was awarded a A$1.5 million grant towards the construction of a biomass electricity co-generation plant and almond production line at its processing plant in Carina West. The project will install a biomass boiler and steam turbine plant, fuelled by almond and orchard waste products, and converting it to heat and power, with excess fed into the electricity grid. It is estimated to consume 30,000 metric tonnes of almond and orchard waste and reduce annual carbon dioxide emissions for the company by more than 23,500 tonnes.

References

External links
 Official website

Companies based in Melbourne
Companies listed on the Australian Securities Exchange
Almond production